Rail transport in Saudi Arabia is an expanding mode of transport.

The Saudi Arabia Railways is the national railway operator. The Saudi Railways Organization was also formerly a major operator, however it was merged into the Saudi Railway Company (now Saudi Arabia Railways) in 2021.

History
The first railway in Arabia was the Hejaz Railway, constructed by the Ottoman Empire from the Damascus to Medina. This  narrow gauge railway opened in 1908, but closed in 1920 due to the Arab Revolt.

Modern railways were introduced in Saudi Arabia after World War II, to facilitate the transport of goods for the Arabian American Oil Company, or Aramco (now Saudi Aramco), from ports located on the coast of the Persian Gulf to warehouses in Dhahran. Construction began in September 1947, and the first line was inaugurated on 20 October 1951. Several development projects have been completed since then, including an extension of the line to Riyadh, construction of several passenger terminals and the opening of a dry port in Riyadh.

The Saudi Railways Organization was merged into the new Saudi Arabia Railways on 1 April 2021.

Network

Haramain High Speed Railway

The Haramain High Speed Railway links the Muslim holy cities of Medina and Mecca via the King Abdullah Economic City and Jeddah.

Saudi Landbridge

A new railway, called the Saudi Landbridge, will connect Jeddah on the Red Sea coast with the Saudi Arabian capital Riyadh.

Dammam–Riyadh line

The Dammam–Riyadh line links Dammam with Riyadh. The passenger line is 449 km long, and has four stations. It was formerly operated by the Saudi Railways Organization.

Riyadh–Qurayyat Line

The Riyadh–Qurayyat line begins at Riyadh and runs northwest toward Al Haditha near the Jordanian border, passing through Majma’a, Qassim, Hail and Al-Jawf. Both passenger and freight services will be operated on this line. There will be six passenger stations on the line which will be in Riyadh at King Khaled International Airport, Majma’a, Qassim, Hail at Prince Abdulaziz Bin Mussa’ad Economic City, Al-Jawf, and Al-Qurayyat.

North-South line

The North-South line runs from Al-Jalamid mine in the Northern province and then passes through Al-Jawf and Hail until Al Baithah Junction in Qassim province. The line then travels east to the processing and export facilities in Ras Al Khair in the Eastern Province. This line will be used solely by freight trains.

Rail links to adjacent countries

Same gauge (
 United Arab Emirates — no connection, proposed as part of the Gulf Railway
 Qatar — no connection, proposed as part of the Gulf Railway
 Oman — no connection, proposed as part of the Gulf Railway
 Bahrain — no connection, proposed as part of the Gulf Railway
 Kuwait — no connection, proposed as part of the Gulf Railway
 Iraq — proposed

Break-of-gauge (
 Jordan — North–South line terminates in Al-Haditha, close to the border

See also
Saudi Arabia Railways
Transport in Saudi Arabia

References

Rail transport in Saudi Arabia
Saudi Arabia